Fray Thomas de San Martín (March 7, 1482 – August 31, 1555) was the founder of the National University of San Marcos in Lima, Peru, a notable Spanish scholar, and was appointed the first Bishop of La Plata o Charcas (1552–1559).

Biography

Early life
San Martín was born in Palencia (in modern-day Castile-Leon). In his youth, he was inspired by the ideals of medieval chivalry. Later he entered in the convent of San Pablo de Córdoba and became professor of arts and theology where he gained the reputation as a prolific scholar. He was sent to Seville to attend the Saint Thomas College.

Achievements in the New World
His work in Peru began as a priest and physician during the Spanish conquest of the Americas in the 1530s. Together with Pizarro and the other conquistadors he brought Catholicism to the New World. Cristóbal Vaca de Castro, who was sent by the Spanish crown to impose order on the newly conquered territories, asked Fray Tomás to establish a provisional government in Peru. It is said that he was selected by Vaca de Castro for the task because of his moral authority and the prestige he enjoyed.

On June 27, 1552, he was appointed by Pope Julius III as Bishop of La Plata o Charcas. He served as Bishop La Plata o Charcas until his death in 1559. During this period, he was highly critical of the brutality of the conquistadors towards the indigenous peoples of the Americas. While Bishop, he was the principal co-consecrator of Bernardino de Carmona, Auxiliary Bishop of Santiago de Compostela.

After his work as priest and scholar over 25 years, he was appointed the first rector magnificus of National University of San Marcos.

Final days
He died at his home in the Convent of Rosario in Lima on August 31, 1555 at the age of 72.

References

External links and additional sources
 (for Chronology of Bishops) 
 (for Chronology of Bishops) 

1482 births
1555 deaths
People from Palencia
16th-century Peruvian Roman Catholic priests
Spanish Dominicans
Bolivian Roman Catholic priests
National University of San Marcos
Bishops appointed by Pope Julius III
Roman Catholic bishops of Sucre